Liana Vicens (born 25 November 1956) is an American former swimmer from Puerto Rico. She competed in four events at the 1968 Summer Olympics. At 11 years old, she remained the youngest known competitor in the history of the Olympic Games . Her son, Tomás Nido, is a catcher for the New York Mets.

References

1956 births
Living people
Puerto Rican female swimmers
Olympic swimmers of Puerto Rico
Swimmers at the 1968 Summer Olympics
Sportspeople from Ponce, Puerto Rico